Sedrun railway station is a metre gauge railway station serving the village of Sedrun, in the Canton of Graubünden, Switzerland.  The station is at the eastern end of the Oberalp Pass.  It forms part of the Furka Oberalp Bahn (FO), which connects Brig in Valais, via Andermatt in Uri, with Göschenen, Uri, and, via the Oberalp Pass, with Sedrun and Disentis/Mustér, Graubünden.

Since , the FO has been owned and operated by the Matterhorn Gotthard Bahn (MGB), following a merger between the FO and the Brig-Visp-Zermatt railway (BVZ).

Services
They also connect in Disentis/Mustér with similar hourly regional services, operated by the Rhaetian Railway and heading further east.

Additionally, during the winter closure of the Oberalp pass road, the MGB also operates frequent car shuttle trains between Andermatt and Sedrun, via the Oberalp Pass.

Every day several Glacier Express trains pass through Sedrun, but do not stop there.

Gallery

See also

Car shuttle train
Oberalp Pass
Matterhorn Gotthard Bahn
Furka Oberalp Bahn

References

Bibliography

External links

 Matterhorn Gotthard Bahn
 

Matterhorn Gotthard Bahn stations
Railway stations in Graubünden
Tujetsch
Railway stations in Switzerland opened in 1926